Paratrachysomus huedepohli is a species of beetle in the family Cerambycidae, and the only species in the genus Paratrachysomus. It was described by Monné and Fragoso in 1984.

References

Onciderini
Beetles described in 1984